Dyke House Sports and Technology College (formerly Dyke House Comprehensive School, and previously Dyke House Secondary Modern School) is a coeducational secondary school located in Hartlepool, County Durham, England.

Previously a foundation school administered by Hartlepool Borough Council, Dyke House Sports and Technology College converted to academy status in May 2013. The school is now part of the Northern Education Trust but continues to coordinate with 
Hartlepool Borough Council for admissions.

Dyke House Sports and Technology College offers GCSEs and BTECs as programmes of study for pupils. The school also has specialisms in sports and technology.

The school has a sixth form.

School history

The school was previously a secondary modern school, opened in 1939. A film was made of activities at the school in 1950.

School characteristics and performance

In 1993, the school was the second nationally following the introduction of Ofsted to be judged to be "causing concern". The then headteacher and staff noted in response the high level of deprivation in the area from which the school's pupils come, and the high level of special educational needs among the school's children. Local authority funding had been reduced.

In 2008, the school was mentioned in the House of Commons as one of a number of schools which had not entered any children for a GCSE in a modern foreign language in the last three years.

As of 2020, the school's most recent full inspection was in 2015, with a judgement of Good. There was a short inspection in 2019, which made no change to the judgement of Good.

In 2019, the school's Progress 8 measure at GCSE was average. The proportion of children achieving Grade 5 or above in English and maths GCSEs was above the average for Hartlepool. Absence and persistent absence were high.

Progress at A-level in 2019 was above average.

Notable former pupils
Harry Chapman, professional footballer

References

External links
 School website
 1950 film of the school
 Old photographs of the school

Secondary schools in the Borough of Hartlepool
Academies in the Borough of Hartlepool
Northern Education Trust schools